Nicolas (bam-bam) Bean (born 1987) is a Canadian-Italian short track speed skater. He represented Italy at the 2010 Winter Olympics in Vancouver.

References

External links

1987 births
Living people
Italian male short track speed skaters
Olympic short track speed skaters of Italy
Short track speed skaters at the 2010 Winter Olympics
Canadian male short track speed skaters
Sportspeople from Ottawa